DWFA-DTV, better known on-air as GNN TV 48 Naga, is a TV station owned by Global Satellite Technology Services and currently an affiliate of the Golden Nation Network in the Philippines. Its studios and transmitter are located at the 5th Floor, S.T. Bldg., Naga College Foundation Compound, Brgy. Peñafrancia, Naga City. It covers the whole Naga City and nearby towns.

GNN TV-48 Naga Programs
GNN NewsBreak
Talk of the Town

Digital television

Digital channels

UHF Channel 48 (677.143 MHz)

GNN TV48 on Cable

See also
Global News Network

Television stations in Naga, Camarines Sur
Digital television stations in the Philippines

ceb:DZGB-TV